Tim Kircher (born 10 March 1999) is a German professional footballer who plays as a right-back for TSV Steinbach.

Career
On 10 June 2019, Kircher joined FC Carl Zeiss Jena on loan from Karlsruher SC for the 2019–20 season.

References

External links
 
 Profile at kicker.de

1999 births
Living people
People from Rastatt
Sportspeople from Karlsruhe (region)
Footballers from Baden-Württemberg
German footballers
Association football fullbacks
Karlsruher SC II players
Karlsruher SC players
FC Carl Zeiss Jena players
VfB Lübeck players
TSV Steinbach Haiger players
3. Liga players
Regionalliga players
Oberliga (football) players